The German Historical Institute in Rome, short DHI Rome, is the oldest of the German historical institutes abroad. Its purpose is to conduct research in the history of both Italy and Germany, and investigate particularly the German-Italian relations in a wider international context from medieval times to the present day.

Institute 
The "Deutsche Historische Institut in Rom", short DHI Rome, was founded as "Prussian Historical Station" in 1888 after the opening of the Vatican Secret Archives. It conducts historical basic research, promotes young academics and is a services facility. As such, the DHI Rome supports German scientists and institutions in their relevant research and promotes the cooperation of German, Italian and international historians. 

In 1960 a Department of Music History was created at the institute, working on the musical cultures of Germany and Italy as well as their relationships in the music history of Europe.

Traditionally, guests, scholarship recipients and research fellows of the German Historical Institute in Rome work in the Vatican Secret Archives and the Vatican Library. Since the 1960s, they focus increasingly on further church and state archives and libraries situated in Rome. The director sides with an Academic Advisory Board. 

The DHI Rome was included in the Max Weber Stiftung – Deutsche Geisteswissenschaftliche Institute im Ausland (Max Weber Foundation – German Humanities Institutes Abroad) (founded in 2002 in Bonn), together with further humanities institutes of the Federal Republic of Germany.

Projects 
The Institute frequently organizes scientific conferences, colloquials and presentations on topics of Italian history and music history as well as the German-Italian relations. It issues several scholarships annually for young Ph.D. and post-doc scholars in the fields of history and music history. German scientists may apply for a one-year guest professorship granted once annually. Several internships of six weeks each are directed at students of history or music history, who focus on German-Italian relations or Italian (music) history. A course of Roman studies in autumn and a course of music history in the spring grants students insights in local history and monuments.

Publications 
The DHI Rome issues several editions since 1892, reflecting the institute's spectrum of research. They include:

Editions und regesta 

 Repertorium Germanicum
The Repertorium Germanicum is a collection of regesta, gathering all "German" topics in the Vatican registers and cameral stock from the Great Schism to the reformation  (1378–1517) since 1897.

 Repertorium Poenitentiariae Germanicum
In addition to the Repertorium Germanicum, the RPG (issued since 1998) offers a fundamental source edition for German history of the late Middle Ages.

 Nuntiaturberichte aus Deutschland
Since 1892, a collection of historical sources concerning the Papal diplomacy of the 16th and 17th centuries.

 Instructiones Pontificum Romanorum
This is a source collection of the instructions for the papal nuncios and delegates at European courts, issued since 1984.

 Concentus musicus
A gathering of musical monuments selected and edited by the Department of Music History since 1973. It focuses on renowned Italian music from the times between 1600 and 1900.

Monographs and anthologies 

 Bibliothek des Deutschen Historischen Instituts in Rom
Since 1905, this series publishes scientific monographs and anthologies on Italian and German history from the early Middle Ages to modern times.

 Ricerche dell’Istituto Storico Germanico di Roma
In order to make the institute's research proceedings known among Italian academics, a series for editions and srtudies in Italian language was founded in 2005.

 Analecta musicologia
This series of editions published by the Music History Department includes anthologies, conference acts of events at the DHI Rome, and monographs since 1963.

Journals 

 Quellen und Forschungen aus italienischen Archiven und Bibliotheken
Since 1898, the institute's journal deals with the relations between Germany and Italy and other topics of Italian history from the early Middle Ages to contemporary history. It includes the director's annual report, conference acts and reports of events at the institute and a large review section.

 Bibliographische Informationen zur neuesten Geschichte Italiens
Published in cooperation with the Arbeitsgemeinschaft für die neueste Geschichte Italiens three time a year since 1974, this journal has introduced over 60.000 scientific publications in the humanities.

Libraries and Archive 
The DHI Rome has both a History Library and a Music History Library. The first specializes in Italian and German history as well as the binational relations, including approximately 171,000 volumes and 667 current journals. The Music History Library has 57,000 media units, including monographs, music and sound carriers, and 440 journals. It comprises a collection of 1,500 rare Librettos (numbers as of 2012). The library catalogues are also available online.
The archive secures all writings of the institute and its precedent institutions from 1888 to today.

Directors 

 1888–1890: Konrad Schottmüller
 1890–1892: Ludwig Quidde
 1892–1901: Walter Friedensburg
 1901–1903: Aloys Schulte
 1903–1936: Paul Fridolin Kehr
 1936–1937: Wilhelm Engel
 1937–1942: Edmund E. Stengel
 1942–1945: Theodor Mayer
 1953–1961: Walther Holtzmann
 1962–1972: Gerd Tellenbach
 1972–1988: Reinhard Elze
 1988–2001: Arnold Esch
 2001-2012: Michael Matheus
 since 2012: Martin Baumeister

Literature 
Lothar Burchardt: Das Deutsche Historische Institut in Rom. In: Geschichte und Gesellschaft Vol. 12 1986 pp. 420–422.
Reinhard Elze, Arnold Esch (eds.): Das Deutsche Historische Institut in Rom 1888–1988. Tübingen 1990 (= Bibliothek des Deutschen Historischen Instituts in Rom, Vol. 70), .
Arnold Esch: Die Gründung deutscher Institute in Italien 1870–1914. Ansätze zu einer Institutionalisierung geisteswissenschaftlicher Forschung im Ausland. In: Jahrbuch der Akademie der Wissenschaften in Göttingen 1997, pp. 159–188.
Arnold Esch: Die Lage der deutschen wissenschaftlichen Institute nach dem Ersten Weltkrieg und die Kontroverse über ihre Organisation. Kehrs „Römische Mission" 1919/1920. In: Quellen und Forschungen aus italienischen Archiven und Bibliotheken 72 (1992), pp. 314–373.
Arnold Esch: L’Istituto Storico Germanico e le ricerche sull’età sueva in Italia. In: Bulletin dell’Istituto storico italiano per il medio evo 96 (1990), pp. 11–17.
Michael Matheus, Die Wiedereröffnung des Deutschen Historischen Instituts 1953 in Rom. Transalpine Akteure zwischen Unione und Nation, in: Die Rückkehr der deutschen Geschichtswissenschaft in die "Ökumene der Historiker". Ein wissenschaftsgeschichtlicher Ansatz, Ulrich Pfeil (ed.), Munich 2008, .
Michael Matheus (ed.): Deutsche Forschungs- und Kulturinstitute in Rom in der Nachkriegszeit. Tübingen 2007 (= Bibliothek des Deutschen Historischen Instituts in Rom, Vol. 112), .
Michèle Schubert: Auseinandersetzung über Aufgaben und Gestalt des Preußischen historischen Instituts in den Jahren 1900–1903. In: Quellen und Forschungen aus italienischen Archiven und Bibliotheken 76 (1996), pp. 383–454.

References

External links 
DHI in Rom
 Max Weber Stiftung – Deutsche Geisteswissenschaftliche Institute im Ausland

Research institutes in Italy
German Historical Institutes